Pedro Rangel Haro (born 13 December 1979 in Guadalajara, Jalisco) is a paralympic swimmer from Mexico competing mainly in category S5 events.

Career
Pedro has competed in both the 2004 and 2008 Summer Paralympics competing in both the 4x50m freestyle, 4x50m medley as well as the 100m breaststroke.  It was in the 100m breaststroke that gave him his only medal at both games a bronze medal in 2004 and a gold in 2008.

Notes

References

External links
 

1979 births
Living people
Paralympic swimmers of Mexico
Sportspeople from Guadalajara, Jalisco
Swimmers at the 2004 Summer Paralympics
Swimmers at the 2008 Summer Paralympics
Swimmers at the 2012 Summer Paralympics
Swimmers at the 2016 Summer Paralympics
Paralympic gold medalists for Mexico
Paralympic bronze medalists for Mexico
Mexican male breaststroke swimmers
Medalists at the 2004 Summer Paralympics
Medalists at the 2008 Summer Paralympics
Medalists at the 2012 Summer Paralympics
Medalists at the 2016 Summer Paralympics
S5-classified Paralympic swimmers
Paralympic medalists in swimming
Medalists at the 2003 Parapan American Games
Medalists at the 2011 Parapan American Games
Medalists at the 2015 Parapan American Games
Medalists at the 2019 Parapan American Games
Medalists at the World Para Swimming Championships